Alan Victor Sharp (born 17 October 1969) is a British former rugby union international who represented Scotland.

A native of Bristol, Sharp was a Scotland representative at underage level but had also toured with England B, prior to his call up to the Scottish national team. He qualified as a Scotland player through his Scottish grandmother.

In 1994 he featured in six Test matches for Scotland as a prop, debuting against England at Murrayfield.

Sharp played his club rugby for the Bristol Bears, Clifton and Coventry.

See also
List of Scotland national rugby union players

References

External links

1969 births
Living people
Scottish rugby union players
Scotland international rugby union players
English people of Scottish descent
Rugby union players from Bristol
Rugby union props
Bristol Bears players
Coventry R.F.C. players